The Argentine Chamber of Phonograms and Videograms Producers (CAPIF) is an Argentine organization member of the IFPI, which represents the music industry in the country. It is a nonprofit organization integrated by multinational and independent record labels.

Sales certification 

CAPIF launched its Gold and Platinum certification program in 1980. Initially, albums required to sell 30,000 units to become Gold and 60,000 units to become Platinum. CAPIF, however, lowered its certification levels in the beginning of 2001 to reflect the declining sales in the recording industry. In 2016, CAPIF once again lowered its certification levels for albums, digital singles and DVD releases, and introduced certifications for music sets (CD+DVD) and certifications based on streaming for both albums and singles.

Current accreditation levels

Historical accreditation levels

Albums

Singles

DVD

Other releases

CAPIF Charts
The CAPIF Charts are the main Argentine music sales charts, issued monthly. The charts are a record of the highest selling singles and albums in various genres. All charts are compiled from data of both physical and digital sales from retailers in Argentina. CAPIF stopped publishing charts since 2018. A weekly top 10 albums chart is now published by Diario de Cultura, while the standard singles chart for the country is now the Argentina Hot 100, published by Billboard.
CAPIF Top 10 Albums (physical sales)
CAPIF Top 10 Singles (digital sales)
CAPIF Top 10 Albums (music stores sales)
CAPIF Year-End Top 10 Albums (physical sales)
CAPIF Year-End Top 10 Singles (digital sales)
CAPIF Year-End Top 10 Albums (music stores sales)

Number-ones
 2021-2022 (albums)
 2017 (albums and singles)
 2018 (albums and singles)

See also
List of diamond-certified albums in Argentina
Sociedad Argentina de Autores y Compositores de Música

References

External links
 Official website

Music organisations based in Argentina
Music industry associations